Ivan Lendl won in the final 6–4, 6–2, 6–1 against Wojciech Fibak.

Seeds
A champion seed is indicated in bold text while text in italics indicates the round in which that seed was eliminated.

Draw

References
1982 World Championship Tennis Fall Finals Draw (Archived 2009-05-07)

Singles